Puru (August 30, 1896 – November 18, 1963), also known as Pu Xinyu 溥心畬, Xinyu being his courtesy name, and Xishan Yishi 西山逸士 (Hermit of West Mountain), which is his sobriquet, was a traditional Chinese painter, calligrapher and nobleman. A member of the Manchu Aisin Gioro clan, the ruling house of the Qing dynasty, he was a cousin to Puyi, the last Emperor of China. It was speculated that Puru would have succeeded to the Chinese throne if Puyi and the Qing government were not overthrown after the 1911 Xinhai Revolution.

Puru was reputed to be as talented as the famous southern artist Zhang Daqian (Chang Ta-ch'ien). Together, they became known as "P'u of the North and Chang of the South."

Puru fled to Taiwan after the Chinese Communist Party came to power, and was appointed by Chiang Kai-shek as a Manchu representative at the Constitutional National Assembly. In Taiwan, he made a living selling paintings and calligraphy, teaching as a professor of fine arts at the National Taiwan Normal University, and eventually dying in Taipei.

Biography 
Puru was born in the Manchu Aisin Gioro clan as the second son of Zaiying (載瀅), a son of Prince Gong. His mother was Lady Xiang (項氏), a secondary spouse of Zaiying.  Puru received "a strictly traditional education" and spent much of his early years at Jietai Monastery, in Xishan (Western Hills), near Beijing.  Being a member of the ruling imperial elite, his family owned a large collection of art works which Puru was able to study as he developed his artistic skills.

Puru was once selected as a potential candidate to succeed the Guangxu Emperor, but his cousin Puyi was chosen instead. After he returned from Europe, he retreated into the Western Mountains, where he spent many years in Jietai Monastery to concentrate on his studies. After the fall of the Qing dynasty in 1911, he changed his family name to "Pu".

In 1947, Puru was appointed by Chiang Kai-shek as a Manchu representative at the Constitutional National Assembly. He was strongly against Puyi's cooperation with the Empire of Japan. In 1949, when the Chinese Communist Party came to power, Pu fled to Taiwan.

In Taiwan, Puru made a living by selling paintings and calligraphy works during the first months of his arrival in Taipei. He lived in a Japanese-style house on Linyi Street in Taipei that the government provided for him. He was appointed in October 1949 as a professor of fine arts at the National Taiwan Normal University. In 1959, he held a two-week-long art exhibition at the National Museum of History with 318 works on display.

Puru died in 1963 and was buried in the Yangmingshan No. 1 Public Cemetery in Taipei.

Career 
Puru worked at a variety of places during his life. These included Kyoto Imperial University (1928-1928), Peking National College of Art (1934-1949), Republic of China National Assembly Representative (1947-1963), National Taiwan Normal University Art Department (1950-1963), and Tunghai University Art Department (1955-1963).

Family and Issue
 Father: Zaiying （載瀅; 1861 - 1909), second son of Prince Gong (sixth son of the Daoguang Emperor).
 Mother: Lady Xiang (項氏), a secondary spouse of Zaiying.
 Spouses:
 Luo Qingyuan (羅清媛)
 Li Moyun (李墨雲)
 Children:
 Pu Yuli (毓岦), Puru's eldest son.
 Pu Yucen (毓岑), Puru's second son.

See also
 Manchu people in Taiwan
 Chang Dai-chien
 Qigong (artist)
 Guanghua Temple (Beijing)
 Qing Dynasty nobility
 Ranks of Imperial Consorts in China Qing
 Taiwanese art

References

Sources
Chinese Master Painter Pu Ru
Master Fuxin Yu

External links
Comprehensive Biography of Pu Ru
Pu Ru Paintings and Calligraphy Exhibition
Poems and writings of Pu Ru
Catalog of Pu Ru's painting collection

Straddling East and West: Lin Yutang, a modern literatus: the Lin Yutang family collection of Chinese painting and calligraphy, an exhibition catalog from The Metropolitan Museum of Art Libraries (fully available online as PDF), which contains material on Puru (see table of contents)

Republic of China painters
Republic of China calligraphers
Humboldt University of Berlin alumni
Aisin Gioro
Painters from Beijing
Qing dynasty imperial princes
1896 births
1963 deaths
Taiwanese people of Manchu descent
Taiwanese painters
Taiwanese calligraphers
Republic of China politicians from Beijing
Politicians of Taiwan
Manchu politicians
Manchu people
Academic staff of the National Taiwan Normal University
Academic staff of Tunghai University
Educators from Beijing
Taiwanese people from Beijing